Hampton Comes Alive is a six-disc live album by the American rock band Phish, released on November 23, 1999, by Elektra Records. It is the band's third live album and the first time complete live Phish concerts were released in their entirety (though fan recordings of most Phish shows are widely circulated). Hampton Comes Alive consists of two full concerts recorded on November 20 and 21, 1998, at the Hampton Coliseum in Hampton, Virginia. The album title is a play on Peter Frampton's classic live album Frampton Comes Alive!.

Twenty of the album's forty-four tracks are covers or other songs from the band's large catalog that do not appear on any previous Phish album. The album's many cover songs include: "Rock and Roll, Pt. 2" by Gary Glitter, "Quinn the Eskimo (The Mighty Quinn)" by Bob Dylan, "Funky Bitch" by Son Seals, "Roses Are Free" by Ween, "Gettin' Jiggy Wit It" by Will Smith, "Cry Baby Cry" by The Beatles, "Boogie On Reggae Woman" by Stevie Wonder, "Nellie Kane" by Hot Rize, "Bold as Love" by The Jimi Hendrix Experience, "Sabotage" by Beastie Boys and "Tubthumping" by Chumbawamba. As usual with covers sung by Jon Fishman, the band (as a trio with Trey Anastasio on drums) also performs a brief instrumental version of "Hold Your Head Up" by Argent before and after "Gettin' Jiggy Wit It." The album marked the first time that the songs "Tube", "Driver", "Axilla I", "Possum", "Piper", "Farmhouse", "Big Black Furry Creature from Mars", "NICU", "Dogs Stole Things" and "Ha Ha Ha" had appeared on an official Phish release.  "Piper" and "Farmhouse" later appeared on the band's 2000 album Farmhouse.

Each CD is packaged in its own sleeve and collected together in an innovative box. The liner notes include fan-contributed photographs and art. The album was nominated for a Grammy for Best Boxed Set Packaging.

Hampton Comes Alive was certified gold by RIAA January 14, 2000.
 
In February 2009, this album was made available as a download in FLAC and MP3 formats at LivePhish.com.

Track listing

Disc one
November 20, 1998 – first set:
"Rock and Roll, Pt. 2" (Glitter, Leander) - 2:04
"Tube" (Anastasio, Fishman) - 4:12
"Quinn the Eskimo (The Mighty Quinn)" (Dylan) - 4:28
"Funky Bitch" (Seals) - 6:53
"Guelah Papyrus" (Anastasio, Marshall) - 6:12
"Rift" (Anastasio, Marshall) - 6:15
"Meat" (Anastasio, Fishman, Gordon, Marshall, McConnell) - 6:16
"Stash" (Anastasio, Marshall) - 12:45

Disc two
November 20, 1998 – first set, continued:
"Train Song" (Gordon, Linitz) - 3:30
"Possum" (Holdsworth) - 10:08
"Roggae" (Anastasio, Fishman, Gordon, Marshall, McConnell) - 8:26
"Driver" (Anastasio, Marshall) - 3:58
"Split Open and Melt" (Anastasio) - 12:50

Disc three
November 20, 1998 – second set:
"Bathtub Gin" (Anastasio, Goodman) - 14:12
"Piper" (Anastasio, Marshall) - 7:04
"Axilla I" (Anastasio, Herman, Marshall) - 4:33
"Roses Are Free" (Freeman, Melchiondo) - 5:32
"Farmhouse" (Anastasio, Marshall) - 5:13
"Gettin' Jiggy wit It" (Barnes, Edwards, Porter, Robinson, Rodgers, Smith) - 7:31
"Harry Hood" (Anastasio, Fishman, Gordon, Long, McConnell) - 12:48
"Character Zero" (Anastasio, Marshall) - 7:37
November 20, 1998 – encore:
"Cavern" (Anastasio, Herman, Marshall) – 4:47

Disc four
November 21, 1998 – first set:
"Wilson" (Anastasio, Marshall, Woolf) - 7:03
"Big Black Furry Creature from Mars" (Gordon) - 5:08
"Lawn Boy" (Anastasio, Marshall) - 2:50
"The Divided Sky" (Anastasio) - 15:12
"Cry Baby Cry" (Lennon, McCartney) - 3:05
"Boogie on Reggae Woman" (Wonder) - 6:12
"NICU" (Anastasio, Marshall) - 5:33

Disc five
November 21, 1998 – first set, continued:
"Dogs Stole Things" (Anastasio, Marshall) - 4:34
"Nellie Kane" (O'Brien) - 3:19
"Foam" (Anastasio) - 10:08
"Wading in the Velvet Sea" (Anastasio, Marshall) - 6:44
"Guyute" (Anastasio, Marshall) - 10:25
"Bold as Love" (Hendrix) - 6:45

Disc six
November 21, 1998 – second set:
"Sabotage" (Diamond, Horovitz, Yauch) - 3:08
"Mike's Song" (Gordon) - 11:50
"Simple" (Gordon) - 15:28
"The Wedge" (Anastasio, Marshall) - 5:56
"The Mango Song" (Anastasio) - 7:44
"Free" (Anastasio, Marshall) - 4:48
"Ha Ha Ha" (Fishman) - 1:33
"Free" (Anastasio, Marshall) - 5:14
"Weekapaug Groove" (Anastasio, Fishman, Gordon, McConnell) - 8:59
November 21, 1998 – encore:
"Tubthumping" (Abbot, Bruce, Greco, Hunter, Nutter, Watts, Whalley) - 5:21

Personnel
Phish
Trey Anastasio – guitars, lead vocals, drums on "Gettin' Jiggy wit It"
Page McConnell – keyboards, backing vocals, lead vocals on "Lawn Boy", "Boogie on Reggae Woman", "Wading in the Velvet Sea" and "Bold as Love", co-lead vocals on "Rift", "Meat" and "Roggae"
Mike Gordon – bass guitar, backing vocals, lead vocals on "Quinn the Eskimo", "Funky Bitch", "Train Song", "Possum", "Nellie Kane" and "Mike's Song", co-lead vocals on "Meat" and "Roggae"
Jon Fishman – drums, backing vocals, lead vocals on "Gettin' Jiggy wit It", co-lead vocals on "Meat" and "Roggae"

Additional musicians:

Carl Gerhard - trumpet on "Cavern" and "Tubthumping"
Tom Marshall - lead vocals on "Tubthumping"

References

External links
Phish's official website
Phish.net Setlists: 11-20-1998 - Detailed setlist and notes
Phish.net Setlists: 11-21-1998 - Detailed setlist and notes

Culture of Hampton, Virginia
LivePhish.com Downloads
Phish live albums
1999 live albums
Elektra Records live albums